Edith Arnheim (née Lasch, 21 February 1884 – 16 October 1964) was a Swedish tennis player who competed in the 1912 Summer Olympics.

She lost the bronze medal match to Molla Bjurstedt, in the outdoor singles. In the indoor singles, she was eliminated in the quarterfinals. In the outdoor mixed doubles, as well as in the indoor mixed doubles, she and her partner Carl-Olof Nylén lost in the first round.

References

1884 births
1964 deaths
Swedish female tennis players
Olympic tennis players of Sweden
Tennis players at the 1912 Summer Olympics
Tennis players from Prague